Glutinoglossum methvenii is a species of earth tongue fungus that was described as new to science in 2015. It is found in Australia and New Zealand, where it grows on moss and decaying logs in mixed deciduous forests. The specific epithet honours mycologist Andrew Methven.

References

External links

Geoglossaceae
Fungi of Australia
Fungi of New Zealand
Fungi described in 2015